Wuhan Museum is a museum in Wuhan, Hubei, China. Construction began in 1984 and it was opened in 1986. In 2001, a new building was completed and opened to the public. The museum was named a national first-grade museum of China in May 2008. In January 2009, Wuhan municipal cultural relic store was merged into Wuhan Museum.

Collection 
Wuhan Museum has a collection of more than 100,000 artifacts, including ceramic, bronzeware, paintings and calligraphy, jade, wood carving, enamelware, seals and so on. As a modern comprehensive museum, Wuhan Museum has the function in cultural relic collection, academic reach, publicity and education, cultural exchange, and recreation and entertainment.

See also 
 List of museums in China

References 

1986 establishments in China
Museums in Wuhan
National first-grade museums of China